The 2019 MTN 8 was the 45th edition of South Africa's annual soccer cup competition, the MTN 8. It featured the top eight teams of the Premier Soccer League at the end of the 2018-19 season.

Teams
The eight teams that competed in the MTN 8 knockout competition are (listed according to their finishing position in the 2018/2019 Premier Soccer League Season):
 Mamelodi Sundowns
 Orlando Pirates
 Bidvest Wits
 Cape Town City
 Polokwane City
 SuperSport United
 Highlands Park
 Bloemfontein Celtic

Quarter-finals

Semi-finals

0–0 on aggregate. Highlands Park won on penalties.

SuperSport United won 3–1 on penalties

Final

References

MTN 8
2019–20 in South African soccer
2019 domestic association football cups